A gubernatorial election was held on 10 November 1968 to elect the first Governor of , the prefecture is the southernmost and westernmost prefecture of Japan.

At that time, the islands were administered by the United States Civil Administration of the Ryukyu Islands.

Candidates 
Chōbyō Yara, 65, endorsed by OSMP, JSP, JCP. He wanted a direct return of the island within Japan, and the rapid evacuation of US military bases.
Junji Nishime, 47, backed by LDP. He wanted a negotiated and gradual return to Japan, and the maintenance of military bases.
Takehiko Noka, 40, for the Ryukyu independence movement. He did not want a return to the empire of Japan, but an independent republic, without  US bases.

Results

See also 
 第1回行政主席通常選挙 (Japanese Wikipedia)

References 

1968 elections in Japan